The 1998 NASCAR Craftsman Truck Series was the fourth season of the Craftsman Truck Series, the third highest stock car racing series sanctioned by NASCAR in the United States. Ron Hornaday Jr. of Dale Earnhardt, Inc. won the championship.

Teams & Drivers 
List of full-time teams at the start of 1998.

Races

Chevy Trucks Challenge 

The Chevy Trucks Challenge was held January 18 at Walt Disney World Speedway. Chuck Bown won the pole.

Top ten results

16-Ron Hornaday Jr.
50-Joe Ruttman
6-Rick Carelli
24-Jack Sprague
80-Greg Biffle
87-Joe Nemechek
3-Jay Sauter
29-Bob Keselowski
18-Butch Miller
78-Rich Bickle

Failed to qualify: Lance Norick (#90), Curtis Markham (#32), David Starr (#9), Dennis Setzer (#04), Freddie Query (#20), Ken Bouchard (#77), Andy Michner (#46), Rick McCray (#42), Billy Bigley (#26), Kirk Shelmerdine (#03), Joe Bush (#67), Dave Goulet (#70), Dave Stacy (#12), Jimmy Davis (#13), Ricky Johnson (#63), Randy Nelson (#82), Kelly Denton (#30), Monty Klein (#47), Rob Morgan (#46), Billy Pauch (#06), Michael Dokken (#64), Jay Stewart (#33), Danny Bagwell (#28)

Florida Dodge Dealers 400 

The Florida Dodge Dealers 400 was held April 4 at Homestead-Miami Speedway. Jack Sprague won the pole.

Top ten results

14-Rick Crawford
24-Jack Sprague
3-Jay Sauter
50-Greg Biffle
35-Ron Barfield Jr.
86-Stacy Compton
29-Bob Keselowski
16-Ron Hornaday Jr.
55-Dave Rezendes
37-Scot Walters

Failed to qualify: Carl Long (#91), Dennis Setzer (#04), Michael Dokken (#64), Mike Garvey (#68), Jamie Skinner (#5), Ken Bouchard (#77), B. A. Wilson (#85), Rick McCray (#42), Tommy Archer (#4), Scott Lagasse (#81), Dominic Dobson (#78), Tim Bolton (#97), Joe Madore (#93), Rob Morgan (#46), Jason Roche (#21), Bobby Myers (#63)

Chevy Trucks 150 

The Chevy Trucks 150 was held April 19 at Phoenix International Raceway. Stacy Compton won the pole.

Top ten results

Ron Hornaday Jr.
Jack Sprague
Stacy Compton
Andy Houston
Rick Crawford
Jay Sauter
Joe Ruttman
Bryan Reffner
Tony Raines
Randy Tolsma

Failed to qualify: Milan Garrett (#85) and Randy Nelson (#82)

Craftsman 200 by NAPA 

The Craftsman 200 by NAPA was held April 25 at Portland Speedway. Greg Biffle won the pole.

Top ten results

Stacy Compton
Randy Tolsma
Rick Carelli
Jack Sprague
Tony Raines
Ron Hornaday Jr.
Bryan Reffner
Jay Sauter
Joe Ruttman
Tony Roper

Failed to qualify: Jason Roche (#21)

NAPACARD 200 

The NAPACARD 200 was held May 8 at Evergreen Speedway. Joe Ruttman won the pole.

Top ten results

Jack Sprague
Ron Hornaday Jr.
Randy Tolsma
Stacy Compton
Mike Wallace
Tony Roper
Rick Carelli
Bryan Reffner
Ron Barfield Jr.
Butch Miller

Failed to qualify: none

Yellow Freight 200 

The Yellow Freight 200 was held May 23 at I-70 Speedway. Tony Raines won the pole.

Top ten results

Tony Raines
Joe Ruttman
Mike Bliss
Bryan Reffner
Jack Sprague
Ron Hornaday Jr.
Mike Wallace
Tony Roper
Wayne Anderson
Andy Houston

Failed to qualify: Richard Hinds (#81), Rick McCray (#42), Joe Bush (#67), Joe Madore (#93), Randy Nelson (#82), Doug George (#26), Ryan McGlynn (#00)

Parts America 150 

The Parts America 150 was held May 30 at Watkins Glen International. Ron Fellows won the pole. Race leader Ron Hornaday Jr. was penalized in the closing laps for jumping a restart and pulled into victory lane regardless to protest NASCAR's call.

Top ten results

Joe Ruttman
Jay Sauter
Boris Said
Ron Hornaday Jr.
Jack Sprague
Mark Simo
Mike Bliss
Rob Rizzo
Randy Tolsma
Mike Wallace

Failed to qualify: Randy Nelson (#82), Doug George (#26), Mike Ewanitsko (#40), Lonnie Rush Jr. (#10), Mike Hope (#13), Ryan McGlynn (#00)

Pronto Auto Parts 400 

The Pronto Auto Parts 400 was held June 5 at Texas Motor Speedway. Jack Sprague won the pole.

Top ten results

Tony Raines
Andy Houston
Joe Ruttman
Kevin Harvick
Stacy Compton
Jack Sprague
Ron Fellows
Dave Rezendes
Rick Carelli
Terry Cook

Failed to qualify: Rob Rizzo (#98), Doug George (#93), Joe Gaita (#83), Chris Horn (#58), Jay Stewart (#33)

Driver Change: Randy Nelson of the #82 qualified for the race but fell ill and Kenny Allen replaced him in the race.

Loadhandler 200 

The Loadhandler 200 was held June 20 at Bristol Motor Speedway. Ron Hornaday Jr. won the pole.

Top ten results

Ron Hornaday Jr.
Jack Sprague
Joe Ruttman
Mike Wallace
Randy Tolsma
Tony Raines
Ron Barfield Jr.
Kevin Cywinski
Jimmy Hensley
Bryan Reffner

Failed to qualify: Danny Bagwell (#28), Tim Bolton (#97), Ed Berrier (#92), Ryan McGlynn (#00), Joe Gaita (#83), Rob Morgan (#57)

DieHard 200 

The DieHard 200 was held July 4 at The Milwaukee Mile. Jack Sprague won the pole.

Top ten results

Mike Bliss
Jimmy Hensley
Jack Sprague
Ron Hornaday Jr.
Greg Biffle
Joe Ruttman
Mike Wallace
Ron Barfield Jr.
Butch Miller

Failed to qualify: Tammy Jo Kirk (#51), Ken Bouchard (#11), B. A. Wilson (#85), Rob Rizzo (#98), Terry Fisher (#41), Barry Bodine (#7), Joe Bush (#67), Jerry Glanville (#81), Danny Bagwell (#28), Chris Horn (#58), Tim Bolton (#97), Randy Nelson (#82)

NAPA Autocare 200 

The NAPA Autocare 200 was held July 11 at Nazareth Speedway. Mike Bliss won the pole.

Top ten results

Ron Hornaday Jr.
Stacy Compton
Jay Sauter
Butch Miller
Joe Ruttman
Jimmy Hensley
Tony Raines
Bryan Reffner
Rick Carelli
Jack Sprague

Failed to qualify: none

The No Fear Challenge 

The No Fear Challenge was held July 18 at California Speedway. Andy Houston won the pole.

Top ten results

Jack Sprague
Ernie Irvan
Ron Hornaday Jr.
Andy Houston
Mike Skinner
Randy Tolsma
Greg Biffle
Boris Said
Mike Bliss
Butch Miller

Failed to qualify: Rick McCray (#42), Randy Nelson (#82), Milan Garrett (#85)

Tempus Resorts 300K 

The inaugural Tempus Resorts 300K was held July 25 at Pikes Peak International Raceway. Mike Bliss won the pole.

Top ten results

Ron Hornaday Jr.
Tony Raines
Joe Ruttman
Rick Carelli
Jimmy Hensley
Mike Bliss
Stacy Compton
Dennis Setzer
Randy Tolsma
Tony Roper

Failed to qualify: none

Cummins 200 by Dodge 

The Cummins 200 by Dodge was held July 30 at Indianapolis Raceway Park. Randy Tolsma won the pole.

Top ten results

Jack Sprague
Tony Roper
Joe Ruttman
Tony Raines
Lonnie Rush Jr.
Randy Tolsma
Greg Biffle
Dennis Setzer
Ron Barfield Jr.
Jay Sauter

This race is mostly known for the infamous white glove incident that involved race winner Sprague and Ron Hornaday Jr. as they head into turn 1 and Hornaday was shoved into the wall.

Failed to qualify: Shayne Lockhart (#33), David Starr (#49), Robbie Pyle (#56)

Pennzoil/VIP Discount Tripleheader 

The Pennzoil/VIP Discount Tripleheader was held August 2 at New Hampshire International Speedway. Mike Wallace won the pole.

Top ten results

Andy Houston
Greg Biffle
Joe Ruttman
Ron Barfield Jr.
Tony Raines
Jimmy Hensley
Kevin Harvick
Jack Sprague
Stacy Compton
Ron Hornaday Jr.

Failed to qualify: none

Stevens Beil/Genuine Car Parts 200 

The Stevens Beil/Genuine Car Parts 200 was held August 8 at Flemington Speedway. Stacy Compton won the pole.

Top ten results

Terry Cook
Ron Hornaday Jr.
Bryan Reffner
Joe Ruttman
Jimmy Hensley
Billy Pauch*
Ron Barfield Jr.
Randy MacDonald
Kevin Harvick
Mike Wallace

Failed to qualify: John Blewett III (#05), George Brunnhoelzl (#40), Lance Norick (#90), Randy Renfrow (#78), Ryan McGlynn (#00)

 John Blewett III drove Pauch's truck for the remainder of the race when Pauch had heat exhaustion.

Federated Auto Parts 250 

The Federated Auto Parts 250 was held August 15 at Nashville Speedway USA. Mike Bliss won the pole.

Top ten results

Jimmy Hensley
Tony Raines
Rick Crawford
Greg Biffle
Mike Wallace
Randy Tolsma
Ron Hornaday Jr.
Scot Walters
Stacy Compton
Ron Barfield Jr.

Failed to qualify: Brandon Butler (#22), Tom Hubert (#77), Cindy Peterson (#36), Ryan McGlynn (#00), Jerry Glanville (#81)

Lund Look 275K 

The Lund Look 275K was held August 23 at Heartland Park Topeka. Boris Said won the pole.

Top ten results

Stacy Compton
Terry Cook
Jimmy Hensley
Jack Sprague
Kevin Harvick
Butch Miller
Jay Sauter
Ron Hornaday Jr.
Joe Ruttman
Bob Keselowski

Failed to qualify: none

Kroger 225 

The Kroger 225 was held August 29 at Louisville Motor Speedway. Terry Cook won the pole.

Top ten results

Tony Raines
Mike Bliss
Andy Houston
Stacy Compton
Terry Cook
Tony Roper
Jimmy Hensley
Greg Biffle
Jack Sprague
Mike Wallace

Failed to qualify: none

Virginia Is For Lovers 200 

The Virginia Is For Lovers 200 was held September 10 at Richmond International Raceway. Joe Ruttman won the pole.

Top ten results

Jack Sprague
Ernie Irvan
Greg Biffle
Joe Ruttman
Butch Miller
Rich Bickle
Randy Tolsma
Rick Carelli
Terry Cook
Mike Wallace

Failed to qualify: Carl Long (#91), Joe Gaita (#83), Tammy Jo Kirk (#51), Shayne Lockhart (#33), Blake Bainbridge (#9), Billy Pauch (#06), Rick Wilson (#04), Terry Fisher (#41), Mike Ewanitsko (#42), Brian Sockwell (#30), Tom Baldwin (#48)

Memphis 200 

The Memphis 200 was held September 13 at Memphis Motorsports Park. Greg Biffle won the pole.

Top ten results

Ron Hornaday Jr.
Jay Sauter
Jimmy Hensley
Joe Ruttman
Rick Crawford
Ron Barfield Jr.
Mike Wallace
Terry Cook
Jack Sprague
Wayne Anderson

Failed to qualify: Ryan McGlynn (#00)

Ram Tough 200 

The Ram Tough 200 was held September 19 at Gateway International Raceway. Greg Biffle won the pole.

Top ten results

Rick Carelli
Ron Hornaday Jr.
Jay Sauter
Jack Sprague
Tom Hubert
Jimmy Hensley
Rick Crawford
Mike Wallace
Scot Walters
Bryan Reffner

Failed to qualify: none

NAPA 250 

The NAPA 250 was held September 26 at Martinsville Speedway. Greg Biffle won the pole.

Top ten results

Jay Sauter
Jimmy Hensley
Ron Hornaday Jr.
Stacy Compton
Rich Bickle
Dennis Setzer
Tony Raines
Greg Biffle
Randy Renfrow
Jack Sprague

Failed to qualify: Greg Marlowe (#30), Carl Long (#91), Nipper Alsup (#92), Mike Olsen (#62), Donny Ling Jr. (#68), Ronnie Newman (#11), Jeff Spraker (#69), Ryan McGlynn (#00)

Kragen/Exide 151 

The Kragen/Exide 151 was held October 11 at Sears Point Raceway. Tom Hubert won the pole.

Top ten results

Boris Said
Mike Bliss
Tony Raines
Joe Ruttman
Jimmy Hensley
Andy Houston
Lance Norick
Jay Sauter
Jack Sprague
Doug George

Failed to qualify: none

Dodge California Truck Stop 300 

The Dodge California Truck Stop 300 was held October 18 at Mesa Marin Raceway. Ron Hornaday Jr. won the pole.

Top ten results

Dennis Setzer
Jack Sprague
Stacy Compton
Ron Hornaday Jr.
Kevin Harvick
Rick Carelli
Butch Miller
Jay Sauter
Andy Houston
Tony Raines

Failed to qualify: none

GM Goodwrench Service/AC Delco 300 

The GM Goodwrench Service/AC Delco 300 was held October 24 at Phoenix International Raceway. Mike Bliss won the pole.

Top ten results

Mike Bliss
Greg Biffle
Ron Hornaday Jr.
Joe Ruttman
Andy Houston
Dennis Setzer
Boris Said
Stacy Compton
Jimmy Hensley
Tony Raines

Failed to qualify: Bill Sedgwick (#4), Brandon Sperling (#42), Mike Clark (#38)

Sam's Town 250 

The Sam's Town 250 was held November 8 at Las Vegas Motor Speedway. Jack Sprague won the pole.

Top ten results

Jack Sprague
Ron Hornaday Jr.
Jimmy Hensley
Jay Sauter
Greg Biffle
Mike Bliss
Joe Ruttman
Mike Stefanik
Ron Barfield Jr.
Butch Miller

Failed to qualify: Rob Morgan (#46), Danny Bagwell (#28), Chris Horn (#58), Austin Cameron (#4), David Starr (#9), Jerry Robertson (#12), Ricky Logan (#36), Mike Clark (#38), Richard Hinds (#81), Milan Garrett (#85)

Final points standings 

Ron Hornaday Jr. – 4072
Jack Sprague – 4069
Joe Ruttman – 3874
Jay Sauter – 3672
Tony Raines – 3596
Jimmy Hensley – 3570
Stacy Compton – 3542
Greg Biffle – 3276
Ron Barfield Jr. – 3227
Mike Bliss – 3216
Rick Carelli – 3195
Andy Houston – 3188
Mike Wallace – 3152
Randy Tolsma – 3121
Butch Miller – 3034
Tony Roper – 3016
Kevin Harvick – 3004
Rick Crawford – 2956
Scot Walters – 2859
Terry Cook – 2845
Boris Said – 2813
Bryan Reffner – 2770
Lance Norick – 2539
Lonnie Rush Jr. – 2333
Wayne Anderson – 2070
Bob Keselowski – 1731
Dennis Setzer – 1728
Kevin Cywinski – 1726
Tammy Jo Kirk – 1296
Randy Renfrow – 1074
Barry Bodine – 1017
Randy MacDonald – 964
Chuck Bown – 927
Doug George – 924
Dominic Dobson – 842
B. A. Wilson – 820
Rob Morgan – 711
Rick McCray – 710
Dave Rezendes – 662
Tom Hubert – 653
Randy Nelson – 634
David Starr – 566
Rich Bickle – 551
Ryan McGlynn – 471
Ron Fellows – 408
Curtis Markham  404
Chris Horn – 375
Ken Bouchard – 350
Milan Garrett – 348
Ernie Irvan – 340

Rookie of the Year 
In his first year of NASCAR competition, Greg Biffle won four poles and had twelve top-tens, earning him Rookie of the Year honors over Andy Houston, who had one win and a twelfth-place points finish. Scot Walters, driving for Brewco Motorsports's truck team, was the last contender to run a full schedule, posting three top-tens. Wayne Anderson was released during the season from his ride Liberty Racing, while Kevin Cywinski and Dominic Dobson were late entrants. Billy Pauch, Mike Cope, Joe Bush and Tommy Archer did not run enough races to qualify for the honor.

See also
1998 NASCAR Winston Cup Series
1998 NASCAR Busch Series

External links 
Craftsman Truck Series Standings and Statistics for 1998 - Racing-Reference.info

NASCAR Truck Series seasons